Smilax canariensis is a species of flowering plants of the Smilacaceae family.<ref name=tropicos>Smilax canariensis at Tropicos</ref> It occurs in Madeira and the Canary Islands. The species was first described by Carl Ludwig Willdenow in 1806. Its Spanish name is zarzaparrilla canaria''.

Description
The species is a climbing wintergreen plant. It has few or no thorns. The width to length ratio of its leaves is about 0.6. The flowers are unisexual, in a simple umbel. Its fruits are black when ripe.

References

External links
Photo of Smilax canariensis

Flora of the Canary Islands
Flora of Madeira
Smilacaceae
Plants described in 1806